The Sambirano woolly lemur (Avahi unicolor), also known as the Sambirano avahi or unicolor woolly lemur, is a species of woolly lemur native to western Madagascar.

Description
The species are located in Cacamba, on the peninsula of Ampasindava, in northwestern Madagascar . This sub-species is distinguished form Avahi occidentalis by its lack of the white facial outline and the lack of the black hairless circles that surround the eyes . The face itself is slightly more pale than the upper head which creates a slight contrasting facial outline caused by the fur length and consistency (facial hair is short and not curled in comparison to the rest of the body) . The contrasting facial outline has a small fur spot above the nose and the forehead that presents the appearance of a dark line . Its eyes are maroon with black, hairless eyelids. The snout is also black and hairless, but the corners of the mouth have a white tint. The fur of the head and body is a light gray-beige, and has a sightly curled, freckled appearance. Its tail is gray-brown or reddish-brown, while the base is a pale brown or cream color. The back is slightly darker in the shoulder-blade area. The lower body's limbs are an off-white color, while the fur on the chest, belly, and inner limbs is fairly thin and light-gray in color.

Habitat
This species is very poorly known, since so far there have been just a few specimens found. They might be living in the Sambirano region in north-western Madagascar. Probable limits of their distribution are the Sambirano River in the north and the Andranomalaza or Maevarano River in the south.

Conservation
As It is not known to which degree the species is hunted, deforestation is probably the main threat it has to face. 
It is listed on Appendix I of CITES. Since there are only a few known specimens in protected areas,
Additional research and extending the reserves would be essential.

References

Woolly lemurs
Mammals described in 2000